This is a list of ecoregions in El Salvador as defined by the World Wildlife Fund and the Freshwater Ecoregions of the World database.

Terrestrial ecoregions

Tropical and subtropical moist broadleaf forests

 Central American montane forests

Tropical and subtropical dry broadleaf forests

 Central American dry forests

Tropical and subtropical coniferous forests

 Central American pine-oak forests

Mangroves

 Gulf of Fonseca mangroves
 Northern Dry Pacific Coast mangroves

Freshwater ecoregions

Tropical and subtropical coastal rivers
 Chiapas - Fonseca

Marine ecoregions

Tropical East Pacific
 Chiapas-Nicaragua

See also
List of ecoregions in Guatemala
List of ecoregions in Nicaragua

References

 
El Salvador
Ecoregions